Just for Kicks is an American comedy series that aired on the Nickelodeon television network as a part of the channel's TEENick television lineup. The series is about a group of girls on a soccer team set in New York City.

Created by Alana Sanko and developed by Whoopi Goldberg, the series was first titled Head to Toe, and then The Power Strikers, but its title was finally changed in 2005 to Just for Kicks. The series premiered in January 2006 on Nickelodeon UK, and in April 2006 on Nickelodeon in the United States. The series is produced by Brookwell McNamara Entertainment. Airing for one season of thirteen episodes, it is also considered to be one of Nickelodeon's most forgotten series, as this show fell to obscurity and was lost for over a decade until May 2, 2016, nearly ten years after its original premiere, when the entire series was uploaded onto YouTube in two parts. Despite this, the show has yet to ever air again on television in over a decade.

Characters

Main characters
 Alexa D'Amico (Francesca Catalano) – She is a typical popular high school girl. She was a former cheerleader and she is fond of boys. She has an older brother, Chris. Towards the end of the series, her father gets laid off of his job, which causes some stress for her. Since Alexa started being a soccer player and she had to stop cheerleading her old, popular friends don't understand why she would rather run around on a muddy field than go shopping. She lives in Brooklyn.
 Winifred "Freddie" Costello (Mallory Low) – She is a tough girl in high school who is not good friends with Alexa because she and her friends are snobs to Freddie at their private school. Her father is always with the military, and she lives with her grandmother. She is also known for having severe cases of "bacne", or acne on her back. Freddie lives in Manhattan on the Upper East Side.
 Lauren Zelmer (Katija Pevec) – Lauren is a shy, timid serious girl who is a good athlete. She is a typical schoolgirl who plays the violin and is on the soccer team, among other activities. Lauren is very intelligent, and is very busy with extracurricular activities, which causes her much stress. She has a big crush on Alexa's older brother Chris, and at the end of the season they start to date, much to Alexa's disbelief. Her overprotective mother works at a local private school, in which Lauren attends. Lauren lives in Harlem, Manhattan.
 Vida Atwood (Jessica Williams) – Vida is a sporty athletic serious girl, who has a lot in common with her soccer mate Lauren Zelmer. She has been playing soccer the longest, and is sort of the unofficial best at the game. She lives at home with her younger brother, older sister, and parents. Vida is self-conscious of her towering height, and it is known that she once beat up a boy back in first or second grade. She lives in Queens.
 Chris D'Amico (Jerad Anderson) – Chris is Alexa's older brother, he is an aspiring filmmaker and somewhat dimwitted.

Recurring characters
 Marni Nelson (Jessica Sara) – A Power Strikers teammate later turned team manager.
 Coach Leslie Moore (Craig Young) – The Power Strikers coach.
 Evan Ribisi (Johnny Palermo) – Chris' best friend who also works at the girls' local hangout the @itude Cafe.
 Courtney (Shelley Buckner) – Alexa's shallow best friend who doesn't like Alexa having interest in soccer.
 Dr. Charles Atwood (Kadeem Hardison) – Vida's dad.
 Mrs. Atwood (JoNell Kennedy) – Vida's mom.
 Ty Atwood (Leon Thomas III) – Vida's annoying little brother.
 Elise Atwood (Shani Pride) – Vida's older sister who is an aspiring model. 
 Mrs. Zelmer (Jenica Bergere) – Lauren's overprotective mom.
 Lucy Costello (Amy Hill) – Freddie's grandmother who she is living with while her parents are overseas in the military.
 Dana Battle (Rinabeth Apostol) – The captain of the Power Strikers who spends every waking minute on the soccer field and is Vida’s foil. When she gets injured, she softens up to the rookies.

Episodes

References

External links
 

2006 American television series debuts
2006 American television series endings
2000s American comedy-drama television series
2000s American high school television series
2000s American teen drama television series
2000s American teen sitcoms
2000s Nickelodeon original programming
English-language television shows
Fictional association football television series
Television series about teenagers
Television series by Brookwell McNamara Entertainment
Television shows set in New York City
Women's association football television series